Ana Barrios Camponovo (born 20 June 1961) is a Uruguayan actress, writer, and illustrator.

Career
Ana Barrios Camponovo studied medicine at the Hospital de Clínicas and specialized in traditional Chinese medicine.

She performed in theater in Uruguay and abroad. She was an actress, scriptwriter, and co-writer for the Teatro de la Barraca group in Uruguay, Argentina, and Brazil from 1983 to 1987.

Her book Juan y la bicicleta encantada won the Bartolomé Hidalgo Award in 1995. It was published in Mexico, the United States, Canada, and the Philippines.

Alfaguara published her book Quepo Quito, which took 2nd Prize at the  Ministry of Education and Culture Awards in 1997.

She lives in Spain where she has an online television program named Universo Infancia.

Awards

Works
 Del verdadero origen de las cometas y otros cuentos del país de los nunca vistos, Tae, 1992, OCLC 42042638
 Francisca y el corazón de las ideas, Tae, 1994
 Juan y la bicicleta encantada, Alfaguara, 1995, 
 Quepo Quito, Alfaguara, 1997, 
 Pipiribicho, Productora Editorial, 1997
 Evaristo camaleón, Productora Editorial, 1997
 Pipiribicho, Ediciones de Picaporte, Uruguay, 1998
 Mandalas a volar, Diputación Provincial de Cuenca/Devas, 2007,  
 Señor niño, National University of Colombia, 2009

References

External links
 Universo Infancia at Asociación El Cuenco de Baubo

1961 births
20th-century Uruguayan actresses
20th-century Uruguayan women writers
Uruguayan illustrators
Living people
Uruguayan children's writers
Uruguayan stage actresses
Uruguayan women children's writers
Uruguayan women illustrators
Writers from Montevideo